Harpalus akinini is a species of ground beetle/ Insect in the subfamily Harpalinae. It was described by Tschitscherine in 1895.

References

akinini
Beetles described in 1895